Poropterus is a genus of beetle belonging to the family Curculionidae.

List of species
 Poropterus abstersus Boheman, 1844 
 Poropterus afflictus Pascoe, 1888 
 Poropterus alboscutellatus Lea, 1911 
 Poropterus angustatus Lea, 1897 
 Poropterus angustus Lea, 1928 
 Poropterus antiquus Boheman, 1844 
 Poropterus approximatus Pascoe, 1871 
 Poropterus archaicus Pascoe, 1885 
 Poropterus astheniatus Lea, 1897 
 Poropterus basalis Lea, 1928 
 Poropterus basiliscus Pascoe, 1888 
 Poropterus basipennis Lea, 1913 
 Poropterus bengueticus Heller, 1912 
 Poropterus bisignatus Pascoe, 1872 
 Poropterus bituberculatus Lea, 1897 
 Poropterus bituberosus Faust, 1898 
 Poropterus bivittatus Faust, 1898 
 Poropterus carinicollis Lea, 1909 
 Poropterus cavernosus Lea, 1905 
 Poropterus cavirostris Lea, 1897 
 Poropterus chevrolati Waterhouse, 1853 
 Poropterus communis Lea, 1897 
 Poropterus concretus Pascoe, 1885 
 Poropterus conifer Boheman, 1844 
 Poropterus constrictifrons Lea, 1913 
 Poropterus convexus Lea, 1913 
 Poropterus corvus Lea, 1897 
 Poropterus crassicornis Lea, 1897 
 Poropterus crassipes Lea, 1913 
 Poropterus cribratus Lea, 1928 
 Poropterus cryptodermus Lea, 1928 
 Poropterus cucullatus Heller, ? 
 Poropterus decapitatus Heller, ? 
 Poropterus difficilis Lea, 1897 
 Poropterus echymis Pascoe, 1885 
 Poropterus ellipticus Pascoe, 1871 
 Poropterus excitiosus Pascoe, 1871 
 Poropterus fasciculatus Lea, 1897 
 Poropterus ferox Faust, 1898 
 Poropterus ferrugineus Lea, 1928 
 Poropterus flexuosus Pascoe, 1871 
 Poropterus foveatus Lea, 1905 
 Poropterus foveipennis Pascoe, 1871 
 Poropterus gemmifer Pascoe, 1885 
 Poropterus glanis Pascoe, 1885 
 Poropterus griseus Lea, 1928 
 Poropterus hariolus Pascoe, 1871 
 Poropterus harpagus Lea, 1897 
 Poropterus humeralis Lea, 1909 
 Poropterus idolus Lea, 1897 
 Poropterus impendens Lea, 1928 
 Poropterus innominatus Pascoe, 1873 
 Poropterus intermedius Lea, 1897 
 Poropterus inusitatus Lea, 1905 
 Poropterus irritus Pascoe, 1888 
 Poropterus jekeli Waterhouse, 1853 
 Poropterus latipennis Lea, 1913 
 Poropterus lemur Pascoe, 1881 
 Poropterus lissorhinus Lea, 1905 
 Poropterus listroderus Lea, 1905 
 Poropterus longipes Lea, 1905 
 Poropterus lutulentus Lea, 1897 
 Poropterus magnus Lea, 1913 
 Poropterus mastoideus Pascoe, 1871 
 Poropterus melancholicus Lea, 1911 
 Poropterus mitratus Pascoe, 1885 
 Poropterus mollis Lea, 1913 
 Poropterus montanus Lea, 1909 
 Poropterus morbillosus Pascoe, 1871 
 Poropterus multicolor Lea, 1913 
 Poropterus musculus Pascoe, 1872 
 Poropterus nodosus Lea, 1905 
 Poropterus obesus Lea, 1928 
 Poropterus odiosus Boheman, 1845 
 Poropterus oniscus Pascoe, 1873 
 Poropterus ordinarius Pascoe, 1885 
 Poropterus ornaticollis Lea, 1913 
 Poropterus orthodoxus Lea, 1897 
 Poropterus papillosus Heller, ? 
 Poropterus parallelus Lea, 1897 
 Poropterus parryi Waterhouse, 1853 
 Poropterus parvidens Lea, 1913 
 Poropterus pertinax Pascoe, 1885 
 Poropterus pervicax Faust, 1898 
 Poropterus pictus Lea, 1928 
 Poropterus platyderes Lea, 1913 
 Poropterus porrigineus Pascoe, 1872 
 Poropterus posterius Lea, 1928 
 Poropterus posticalis Lea, 1913 
 Poropterus prodigiosus Heller, 1935 
 Poropterus prodigus Pascoe, 1873 
 Poropterus punctipennis Lea, 1928 
 Poropterus python Pascoe, 1881 
 Poropterus rhyticephalus Lea, 1905 
 Poropterus rubeter Lea, 1913 
 Poropterus rubus Lea, 1897 
 Poropterus satyrus Pascoe, 1873 
 Poropterus sciureus Pascoe, 1885 
 Poropterus setipes Lea, 1928 
 Poropterus sharpi Faust, 1898 
 Poropterus simsoni Lea, 1913 
 Poropterus socius Pascoe, 1885 
 Poropterus solidus Faust, 1898 
 Poropterus sphacelatus Pascoe, 1871 
 Poropterus stenogaster Lea, 1913 
 Poropterus submaculatus Lea, 1928 
 Poropterus succisus Hustache, 1936 
 Poropterus succosus Boheman, 1844 
 Poropterus sulciventris Lea, 1909 
 Poropterus sylvicola Lea, 1928 
 Poropterus tetricus Pascoe, 1874 
 Poropterus trifoveiventris Lea, 1913 
 Poropterus tumulosus Pascoe, 1873 
 Poropterus undulatus Lea, 1911 
 Poropterus variabilis Lea, 1897 
 Poropterus varicosus Pascoe, 1873 
 Poropterus verres Pascoe, 1871 
 Poropterus vicarius Pascoe, 1885 
 Poropterus waterhousei Pascoe, 1871 
 Poropterus westwoodi Waterhouse, 1853

References 

 Wtaxa
 Global Species
 Encyclopedia of Life

Molytinae